DNHS is an abbreviation that may refer to: DNHS.VN

 Divisoria National High School, Divisoria, Bontoc, Southern Leyte, Philippines
 Dalandanan National High School, Valenzuela City, Metro Manila, Philippines
 D N Himatsingka High School, Kokrajhar, Assam, India
 One of several schools in the United States named Del Norte High School
 Dadabhai Navroji High School, Anand, Gujarat, India
 Dao National High School
 Donna North High School, Hidalgo County, Texas